The Heysen Trail is a long distance walking trail in South Australia.

Route summary
From north to south, the route of the trail may be summarised by the following landmarks in order: Parachilna Gorge - Flinders Ranges National Park - Hawker - Quorn - Mount Remarkable National Park - Melrose - Crystal Brook - Spalding - Burra - Kapunda - Adelaide Hills - Deep Creek Conservation Park - Cape Jervis

Due to bushfire risk, large sections of the trail are closed annually from December through to April.

Most people choose to walk sections of the track for one or a few days at a time. There are many places to stay along the trail and hardy walkers who walk the track from beginning to end typically do so in about 60 days.

The Friends of the Heysen Trail is a non-profit volunteer organisation dedicated to the maintenance, development and promotion of the Heysen Trail and other walking trails; and to the promotion of bushwalking as a healthy leisure activity.

A regular walking program is conducted by a walking sub-committee. Different grades of walks cater for beginners and for more experienced walkers.

Geology and biology

The trail passes cliffs, farmland, natural bushland, forests, vineyards, and grazing land. It extends from the ocean through the fertile Mount Lofty Ranges across Goyder's Line to the arid Flinders Ranges, with many different bioregions.

History
The trail was first suggested by Warren Bonython in 1969 but design was stalled by several years due to government politics and issues with private land owners. The first 50 kilometres of the track was laid through the Mount Lofty Ranges in 1978 after responsibility for the track was handed to the Department of Recreation and Sport. Terry Lavender was the main designer for the track and oversaw the majority of its construction until it was completed in 1992.

The trail is named after Sir Hans Heysen.

Images

See also
The Dutchmans Stern Conservation Park
Mount Brown (South Australia)
Wapma Thura–Southern Flinders Ranges National Park
Ikara–Flinders Ranges National Park
Mount Remarkable National Park
Kyeema Conservation Park
Mount Magnificent Conservation Park
Caroona Creek Conservation Park
Hopkins Creek Conservation Park
Kaiserstuhl Conservation Park
Finniss Conservation Park
List of long-distance hiking tracks in Australia

References

External links
The Heysen Trail - Department of Environment Water and Natural Resources website

Hiking and bushwalking tracks in South Australia
Fleurieu Peninsula
Flinders Ranges
1992 establishments in Australia